Tipula fuliginosa, the sooty crane fly, is a species of large crane fly in the family Tipulidae. It is found in Europe.

References

Tipulidae
Articles created by Qbugbot
Insects described in 1823